Qanat is a water management system.

Qanat or Qannat may refer to various places in Iran:
 Qanat, Bushehr
 Qannat, Kavar, Fars Province
 Qanat, Rostam, Fars Province
 Qanat, Sepidan, Fars Province
 Qanat, Kohgiluyeh and Boyer-Ahmad
 Qanat, Lorestan
 Qanat, South Khorasan
 Qanat-e Kasian, Lorestan
 Qnat, Lebanon

See also
 "Qanat" is a common element in Iranian place names, see .
 Qantas (disambiguation) misspelling